The Jubilee Medal "30 Years of the Soviet Army and Navy" was a state military commemorative medal of the Soviet Union established on February 22, 1948 by decree of the Presidium of the Supreme Soviet of the USSR to denote the thirtieth anniversary of the creation of the Soviet Armed Forces.  Its statute was later amended by decree of the Presidium of the Supreme Soviet of the USSR of July 18, 1980.

Medal statute 
The Jubilee Medal "30 Years of the Soviet Army and Navy" was awarded to all the generals, admirals, officers, warrant officers, sergeants, petty officers, soldiers and sailors, who were members of the Armed Forces of the USSR, of the troops of the Ministry of Internal Affairs or of the Ministry for State Security on 23 February 1948. 

The medal was awarded on behalf of the Presidium of the Supreme Soviet of the USSR by commanders of military units and institutions. 

The Jubilee Medal "30 Years of the Soviet Army and Navy" was worn on the left side of the chest and when in the presence of other medals of the USSR, it was located immediately after the Jubilee Medal "XX Years of the Workers' and Peasants' Red Army".  If worn in the presence or Orders or medals of the Russian Federation, the latter have precedence.

Medal description 
The Jubilee Medal "30 Years of the Soviet Army and Navy" was a 32mm in diameter circular brass medal.  On the obverse, the right profile busts of Lenin and Stalin (nearer); at the bottom, the relief Roman numeral "XXX".  On the reverse, the circular relief inscription along the entire medal's circumference "TO COMMEMORATE THE THIRTIETH ANNIVERSARY" separated at the very bottom by a relief five pointed star; in the center, the relief inscription in two rows "SOVIET ARMY AND NAVY" with just below the dates "1918–1948".
  
The Jubilee Medal "30 Years of the Soviet Army and Navy" was secured by a ring through the medal suspension loop to a standard Soviet pentagonal mount covered by a 24mm wide silk moiré grey ribbon with two 2mm red edge stripes and a central 8mm red stripe.

Recipients (partial list) 
All individuals listed below are recipients of the Jubilee Medal "30 Years of the Soviet Army and Navy".
Army General Semion Pavlovich Ivanov
Lieutenant General Nikolai Pavlovich Simoniak
Marshal of Aviation Serhi Gnatovich Rudenko
Army General Sergei Matveevich Shtemenko
Captain 3rd grade Michael Petrovich Tsiselsky
Captain 1st grade Ivan Vasilyevich Travkin
Lieutenant General Vasily Mikhaylovich Badanov
Army General Kuzma Nikitovich Galitsky
Marshal of the Soviet Union Sergey Semyonovich Biryuzov
Marshal of the Soviet Union Vasily Danilovich Sokolovsky
Marshal of the Soviet Union Ivan Ignatyevich Yakubovsky
Marshal of the Soviet Union Vasily Ivanovich Chuikov
Marshal of the Soviet Union Kliment Yefremovich Voroshilov
Admiral of the Fleet of the Soviet Union Nikolay Gerasimovich Kuznetsov
Marshal of the Soviet Union Georgy Konstantinovich Zhukov
Captain Vasily Grigoryevich Zaytsev
Marshal of the Soviet Union Semyon Konstantinovich Timoshenko
Colonel Pavel Ivanovich Belyayev
Dmitriy Feodorovich Ustinov Marshal of the Soviet Union
Marshal of Aviation Alexander Ivanovich Pokryshkin
Admiral Vladimir Filippovich Tributs
Admiral Filipp Sergeyevich Oktyabrskiy

See also 
Red Army
Awards and decorations of the Soviet Union

References

External links 
 Legal Library of the USSR

Military awards and decorations of the Soviet Union
1948 establishments in the Soviet Union
Awards established in 1948